The Zambian passport is issued to citizens of Zambia for international travel.

As of 1 January 2017, Zambian citizens had visa-free or visa on arrival access to 63 countries and territories, ranking the Zambian passport 73rd in terms of travel freedom (tied with Cape Verdean and Tunisian passports) according to the Henley visa restrictions index.

Languages

The data page/information page is printed in English and French.

References

See also 

 List of passports
 Visa requirements for Zambian citizens

Passports by country
Government of Zambia
Zambia and the Commonwealth of Nations